Euphoria sepulcralis, the dark flower scarab, is a species of scarab beetle in the subfamily Cetoniinae. It is found in North America in countries such as Mexico and southern and Central United States.

References

Further reading

Cetoniinae
Beetles of North America